C47 or C-47 may refer to:
 C47 road (Namibia)
 Caldwell 47, a globular cluster
 A clothespin used in filmmaking
 Douglas C-47 Skytrain, an American military transport aircraft
 Four Knights Game, a chess opening
 Nike Missile Site C-47 near Portage, Indiana
 Portage Municipal Airport in Columbia County, Wisconsin